Shooting competitions at the 2024 Summer Olympics in Paris are scheduled to take place from 27 July to 5 August 2024 at the National Shooting Center in Châteauroux. Unlike in the previous Olympics, the number of shooters competing across fifteen events at these Games has been reduced from 360 to 340, with an equal distribution between men and women. Furthermore, several significant changes are instituted in the Olympic shooting program, including the new final format and the substitution of the mixed team trap competitions with the mixed team skeet.

Competition format
On 9 June 2017, the International Shooting Sport Federation welcomed the decision of the International Olympic Committee to approve several changes to the Olympic shooting program to enhance the sport's popularity and worldwide appeal. One of the significant changes in the program was to replace the mixed team trap competition with the mixed team skeet as a means of maintaining and attaining gender equality in sport shooting. Other ratified changes included the reduction of athletes from 360 in Tokyo 2020 to 340 and the new elimination final format for each individual shooting event.

All shooters who advance to the Olympic finals of their individual events must start from scratch and hit a specific number of shots in the elimination stages. For the small-bore pistol and shotgun events, four finalists will compete in each of the two elimination relays with the winner and runner-up proceeding to the medal rounds. For the rifle and air pistol events, the eight finalists will compete against each other until the elimination round leaves with only two shooters battling out in a duel to decide the gold and silver medals.

Qualification

In early 2022, the International Shooting Sport Federation agreed to change the rules on the allocation of the Olympic quota places, as it aims to attain gender equality. As a result, a total of 340 quota places, with an equal distribution between men and women, will be awarded at the top-level global and continental championships.

As per the guidelines from the International Shooting Sport Federation, the qualification period commences with the 2022 European Championships for shotgun events in Larnaca, Cyprus and for small-bore rifle and pistol events in Wrocław, Poland, which concludes on 18 September 2022, less than two years before the Olympics. There, sixteen quota places will be assigned to the top two NOCs in each individual shooting event. For the remainder of the 2022 season, sixty more quota places will be awarded, including forty-eight from the separate rifle, pistol, and shotgun meets of the ISSF World Championships.

Throughout the process, quota places will be generally awarded when a shooter posts a top finish at the ISSF World Championships or the continental championships (Africa, Europe, Asia, Oceania, and the Americas).

After the qualification period concludes and all NOCs receive the official list of quota places, the ISSF will check the World Ranking list in each of the individual shooting events. The highest-ranked shooter, who has not qualified in any event and whose NOC does not have a berth in a specific event, will obtain a direct Olympic quota place.

Similar to the previous Games, host nation France is guaranteed twelve quota places, with one in each of the individual shooting events.

Competition schedule

Medal summary

Medal table

Men's events

Women's events

Mixed events

See also
Shooting at the 2022 Asian Games
Shooting at the 2023 European Games
Shooting at the 2023 Pan American Games

References

External links
 Paris 2024 – Shooting

 
2024
2024 Summer Olympics events
Olympics
Olympics